The Heirloom Seal of the Realm, also known in English as the Imperial Seal of China, was a Chinese jade seal carved out of the Heshibi, a sacred piece of jade. The Seal was created in 221 BC, shortly after Qin Shi Huang unified China and established the Qin dynasty, China's first imperial dynasty. The Heirloom Seal served as the imperial Chinese seal throughout the next millennium of Chinese history, and its possession was seen as a physical symbol of the Mandate of Heaven. 

The Heirloom Seal was lost around the end of the Tang dynasty (618–907) or during the Five Dynasties and Ten Kingdoms period (907–960).

Creation
In 221 BC, the Seal was created when Qin Shi Huang destroyed the remaining Warring States and united China under the Qin Dynasty. Heshibi was a famous piece of jade stone which previously belonged to the Zhao state. Passing into the hands of the new Emperor of China, he ordered it made into his Imperial seal. The words, "Having received the Mandate from Heaven, may (the emperor) lead a long and prosperous life." (受命於天, 既壽永昌) were written by Prime Minister Li Si, and carved onto the seal by Sun Shou.

The Seal was carved from jade because, in ancient China, jade was symbolic of the inner beauty within humans. Many tombs and burials from ancient China contained decorative jade, including a jade burial suit unearthed in 1968 that belonged to a Han prince, Liu Sheng. During the Han dynasty, the Chinese associated jade with immortality to a point where some individuals attempted to drink jade in liquid form to gain eternal life. This association further complements the idea of the Mandate of Heaven and why the Seal was carved in jade, China's most valued material for thousands of years.

The Romance of the Three Kingdoms says that Liu Bang, who became the first Han emperor, saw a Phoenix sitting on a rock and presented the rock to Xiang Yu, the king of Chu, who split the stone in two with his sword and found the jade with which the seal was carved.

Han dynasty and Three Kingdoms period
At the death of the second Emperor of Qin, his successor Ziying proffered the Seal to the new emperor of the Han dynasty, whereafter it was known as the "Han Heirloom Seal of the Realm". At the end of the Western Han dynasty in 9 CE, Wang Mang, the usurper, forced the Han empress dowager to hand over the Seal. The empress dowager, in anger, threw the Seal on the ground, chipping one corner. Later, Wang Mang ordered the corner to be restored with gold.

This Seal passed on even as dynasties rose and fell. It was seen as a legitimizing device, signalling the Mandate of Heaven. During turbulent periods, such as the Three Kingdoms period, the seal became the object of rivalry and armed conflict. Regimes which possessed the seal declared themselves, and are often historically regarded, as legitimate. At the end of the Han dynasty in the 3rd century AD, General Sun Jian found the Imperial Seal when his forces occupied the evacuated Han imperial capital Luoyang, in the course of the campaign against Dong Zhuo, giving it to his chief, warlord Yuan Shu. The Romance of the Three Kingdoms says that one of Sun Jian's men betrayed him and told about the Seal to the coalition leader Yuan Shao who asked him for the seal, but Sun Jian refused. He swore that if he had the Seal, he might die a violent death, and set out for his home. Nevertheless, Yuan Shao told Liu Biao to block his way; Liu Biao did so, though he was unable to defeat Sun Jian. This began a rivalry between them, and Sun Jian, according to his oath, died a violent death in an ambush while fighting Liu Biao later on. Sun Jian's son, Sun Ce inherited the seal and gave it to Yuan Shu so that he might lend him troops to take revenge for his uncle, who had been fighting Warlord Lu Kang.

Yuan Shu then declared himself emperor under the short-lived Zhong dynasty in 197. This act angered the warlords Cao Cao and Liu Bei, leading to several crushing defeats by each army. The other warlords, even after being issued with an imperial decree, refused to help Cao Cao and Liu Bei in defeating Yuan Shu. When Yuan Shu was defeated in 199 by Liu Bei, the Seal came into the hands of Cao Cao, whose son Cao Pi proclaimed the Wei Dynasty as the legitimate successor state to Han, in 220, in response to the established states of Shu Han and Eastern Wu. The Seal remained in the hands of Wei Dynasty emperors until the last emperor Cao Huan was forced to abdicate in Sima Yan's favor, passing the Seal from Cao to Sima and establishing the Jin dynasty in 265.

Loss
The Seal was passed through the Cao Wei Dynasty, Jin Dynasty, Sixteen Kingdoms period, Southern and Northern Dynasties period, Sui Dynasty and Tang Dynasty, but was lost to history in the Five Dynasties and Ten Kingdoms period (907-960).

The fate of the seal during and after the Five Dynasties and Ten Kingdoms period is not known. Three theories exist as to when, and how, it was lost:

 At the end of the Later Tang, when the last emperor died by self-immolation.
 In 946 AD when the Emperor Taizong of Liao captured the last emperor of the Later Jin state.
 The seal came into the hands of the later Yuan emperors. 

When the Ming armies captured the Yuan capital in 1369, it captured just one out of the eleven personal seals of the Yuan emperors. The Heirloom Seal was not found. In 1370, Ming armies invaded the Northern Yuan dynasty and captured some treasures brought there by the retreating Yuan emperor. However, once more the Heirloom Seal was not found. By the beginning of the Ming Dynasty, the Seal was known to be lost. Neither the Ming nor the Qing dynasties possessed it. This partly explains the Qing Emperors' obsession with creating numerous imperial seals – for the emperors' official use alone the Forbidden City in Beijing has a collection of 25 seals – in order to reduce the significance of the Heirloom Seal.

In the early 20th century, as the Qing Empire pursued reforms to modernise its system of government, a series of official seals were created for use on documents and instruments of the imperial government. Although square in shape following the traditional design, the seal dies themselves were made of wood, in imitation of western government precedents and, contrary to earlier Qing imperial seals which were bilingual (Chinese and Manchu), had only Chinese text. Four seal dies were carved: "The Seal of the Great Qing" (大清國寶), "The Seal of the Great Qing Emperor" (大清皇帝之寶), "The Great Seal of the Great Qing Empire" (大清帝國之璽), and "The Seal of the Emperor of the Great Qing Empire" (大清帝國皇帝之寶). Of these, the Great Seal of the  Great Qing Empire represented the official, modern "replacement" for the lost heirloom seal. The seal dies are in the collection of the Palace Museum in Beijing, and none show signs of use. After the fall of the Qing Empire in 1912, the Republic of China government likewise adopted a set of square-shaped official seals. The People's Republic of China initially adopted a similar square seal, but this fell out of use by 1954.

Several seals have since been claimed as the lost Heirloom Seal, but none have held up under scrutiny. In at least one case, the seal concerned was found to be a personal seal of an emperor, rather than the Heirloom Imperial Seal.

See also
 National seals of the Republic of China
 Seal of the People's Government of the People's Republic of China
 Imperial Seal of the Mongols
 Imperial Seal of Japan
 Imperial Seal of Korea
 Imperial Seal of Manchukuo
 Seal (East Asia)
 Seal script
 Nine Tripod Cauldrons

References

Citations

Sources 

 Chen Shou (3rd century). Pei Songzhi (ed.) 三國志 [Records of the Three Kingdoms]. Taipei: Dingwen Printing, 1977.
 Morrow, David & Pearlstein, Elinor (1998). "Immortal stone: Jade of the Han dynasty". Calliope, 9(2): 24.

External links 

China
National symbols of China
Regalia
Government of Imperial China
Chinese heraldry